The Church of Immaculate Conception of Bangkok, also known as Wat Khamen, is the oldest Catholic church in Thailand. Its name Immaculate Conception comes from the Catholic belief that by the will of God the Virgin Mary was conceived free from original sin. The Church's history and construction is an example of the religious tolerance of the Thai people.

History 

The first Portuguese missionaries arrived in Thailand in 1567. Bangkok, at that time, was still a transit port along the Chao Phraya river on the way to Ayutthaya.
In 1674, during the Ayutthaya era, King Narai the Great granted land in Bangkok to the Portuguese community to build the Church of Immaculate Conception. The French had attempted under several expeditions to Thailand to try to convert King Narai to Catholicism, despite his refusal, he allowed both French and Portuguese missionaries to continue their work in spreading their faith. During the building of the church the city of Ayutthaya was captured by the Burmese and this halted progression for a while however construction soon continued.

During the Bangkok era King Rama I invited the Portuguese traders to return in order to stimulate the economy and the church was rebuilt in 1785. The Church was rebuilt on two other occasions in 1832 and 1847 by an influential French missionary Monsignor Pallegoix. The building from 1847 remains today.

The Church and refugees 

The Church has a long history associated with refugees. In 1785 the Portuguese came with Cambodian refugees who had fled the civil war of their country. They were the main contributors in rebuilding the church. During this period 500 Cambodians took refuge in the church and it was later renamed Bot Ban Khamen or Cambodian Village Church.

Vietnamese immigration increased in Thailand due to religious persecution in Vietnam. In 1832 Thailand waged a war with Vietnam and many prisoners of war taken to Thailand refused to return to Vietnam and preferred to stay in Bangkok. They rebuilt the Church in 1832 and it was called Bot Ban Yuan or Vietnamese Village Church.

Location 

Soi Mitrakham, Samsen, Bangkok, Thailand.

Sources 
http://www.tour-bangkok-legacies.com/immaculate-conception-church.html
https://web.archive.org/web/20030227151139/http://www.mfa.go.th/web/112.php
https://web.archive.org/web/20090621210217/http://www.mfa.go.th/web/117.php

Roman Catholic churches in Bangkok
Portuguese diaspora in Thailand
Unregistered ancient monuments in Bangkok